Sir James Blindell (1884 – 10 May 1937) was an English Liberal Party politician in the United Kingdom, who served as the Member of Parliament (MP) for Holland with Boston from 1929 until his death.

Born in Hitchin, Hertfordshire, Blindell was first elected as the constituency's MP at a by-election in March 1929, caused by the death of the Conservative MP Arthur Dean.  At the time he was managing director of a boot manufacturing business. Blindell overturned a Conservative majority of nearly 5,000 to win with a majority of 3,706.  His victory was the last Liberal by-election gain until Torrington in 1958.

Blindell was re-elected as a Liberal at the 1929 general election, but in 1931 he was one of the Liberal MPs who broke with their party to support Ramsay MacDonald's National Government, eventually forming the National Liberal Party.

He was re-elected as a National Liberal at the 1931 general election and at the 1935 general election.  In both elections, the Conservatives (who also supported the National Government) did not field a candidate against him, and he was returned with large majorities.

Blindell was knighted in 1936. He was killed in a car accident in 1937 in Stickford, near Spilsby, Lincolnshire. The car overturned when the driver swerved to avoid dogs in the road. Sir James died within five minutes of massive head injuries. Lady Blindell survived the accident with minor injuries.

At the consequent 1937 Holland with Boston by-election, Herbert Butcher held the seat for the National Liberals.

References

External links 
 

1884 births
1937 deaths
Liberal Party (UK) MPs for English constituencies
National Liberal Party (UK, 1931) politicians
UK MPs 1924–1929
UK MPs 1929–1931
UK MPs 1931–1935
UK MPs 1935–1945
Knights Bachelor
Politicians awarded knighthoods
Road incident deaths in England